Steve Goossen (born 12 November 1968) is a Dutch former professional footballer who played as a defender.

Career
Goossen was born in Goirle, North Brabant, but spent a large part of his childhood in Suriname. Goossen eventually left for Belgian club Lierse, where he made his breakthrough as a senior player.

At the age of 21, the centre back made his debut in professional football for Lierse. Within a year, Goossen had become a starter. He played for the Belgian club for seven seasons. Before the start of the 1996–97 season, Goossen signed with Eredivisie club Vitesse. Goossen eventually made 71 appearances for Vitesse, alternating as left back and central defender. Due to the arrival of Pieter Collen, Vitesse decided not to renew his contract in 1999, and he eventually left for Sparta Rotterdam. After Sparta's relegation in the 2001–02 season, Goossen decided to retire from professional football, citing a lack of motivation. He played one more season at amateur level for Deltasport in the Hoofdklasse.

References

External links
Voetbal International profile

1968 births
Living people
People from Goirle
Association football defenders
Dutch footballers
Lierse S.K. players
SBV Vitesse players
Sparta Rotterdam players
Belgian Pro League players
Eredivisie players
Vierde Divisie players
Dutch sportspeople of Surinamese descent
Dutch expatriate footballers
Expatriate footballers in Belgium
Dutch expatriate sportspeople in Belgium
Footballers from North Brabant